Giada Di Miceli (born 18 January 1987 in Rome) is an Italian television presenter and radio personality.

Biography
Graduated in philosophy; from 2011 led the program  Non succederà più on Radio Manà Manà.

Since 2014, she moved on Radio Radio Station (FM 104.5)

Television
(2005) - Vivo di moda giovane, Sky Vivo 
(2007) - Buona Domenica, Canale 5 
(2008) - La Talpa, Italia 1
(2013) - Speciale Sanremo 2013, Sky Uno

Radio
 (2011–present) Non succederà più, Radio Manà Manà since 2014 this radio show moved on Radio Radio

Theater
(2001) - Bentornato signor Bertolt Brecht
(2003) - Bertoldo a Corte”, directed by Gianfraco Mazzoni 
(2006) - l’Amore è eterno e la pazzia lo accompagna, directed by Gianfranco Mazzoni.

Film

Movies
(2005) - Ad occhi aperti, directed by Marco Bergami
(2005) - 13dici a tavola, directed by Enrico Oldoini

Television
(2004) - Carabinieri tre, fiction TV, Canale 5.

See also
 Radio Manà Manà

References

External links
 
 Sito ufficiale
 Non succederà più>Radio Manà Manà
 Giada Di Miceli>My Movies

1986 births
Living people
Italian television presenters
Italian women television presenters
Italian radio presenters
Italian women radio presenters
Mass media people from Rome